Carl William Blegen (January 27, 1887 – August 24, 1971) was an American archaeologist who worked at the site of Pylos in Greece and Troy in modern-day Turkey.  He directed the University of Cincinnati excavations of the mound of Hisarlik, the site of Troy, from 1932 to 1938.

Background
Blegen was born in Minneapolis, Minnesota, the eldest of six children born to Anna Regine (1854–1925) and John H. Blegen (1851–1928), both of whom  had emigrated from Lillehammer, Norway. His younger brother was noted historian Theodore C. Blegen. His father was a professor at Augsburg College in Minneapolis for more than 30 years and played a major role in the Norwegian Lutheran Church in America. Blegen earned his bachelor's degree from the University of Minnesota in 1904 and started graduate studies at Yale University in 1907.

Career

In Greece, he was a fellow at the American School of Classical Studies at Athens (1911–1913), during which time he worked on excavations at Locris, Corinth and Korakou.  During World War I Blegen was involved with relief work in Bulgaria and Macedonia, receiving the Saviors Order from Greece in 1919.  After the war he completed his Ph.D. at Yale (1920). He was then assistant director of the American School (1920–26); during his tenure he excavated at Zygouries, Phlius, Prosymna, and Hymettos.   In 1927,  Blegen joined the faculty of the University of Cincinnati. Blegen was professor of classical archaeology at the University of Cincinnati from 1927 to 1957.  His excavations at Troy were performed between 1932 and 1938, followed by those at the Palace of Nestor in Pylos, Greece in 1939 (the dig resumed 1952–1966). Many of the finds from this excavation are housed in the Archaeological Museum of Chora. Blegen retired in 1957.

He received honorary degrees from the University of Oslo and the University of Thessaloniki in 1951; an honorary D.Litt. from the University of Oxford in 1957 and an honorary LL.D. from the University of Cincinnati in 1958.  Further honorary degrees came in 1963:  Litt.D. from Cambridge, and others from the University of Athens, Hebrew Union College, Jewish Institute of Religion in Jerusalem.  In 1965 Blegen became the first recipient of the Archaeological Institute of America's  Gold Medal for archaeological achievement.

The Carl Blegen Library is located on the campus of the University of Cincinnati. The library has curated an exhibit named Discovering Carl Blegen which includes images from Blegen's major campaigns in Troy and Pylos as well as his work and life at UC and abroad. Blegen Library at the American School of Classical Studies at Athens is named also after Carl Blegen. Blegen Hall on the University of Minnesota Twin City Campus is named for his brother Theodore C. Blegen.

Personal life
Asked how to pronounce his name, Blegen told The Literary Digest: "Seeking the pagan is Doctor Blegen (blay'gen).

In 1923, Blegen proposed marriage to Elizabeth Denny Pierce (1888–1966), whom he had met in the American School of Classical Studies in Athens; Pierce initially accepted but then ended the engagement as she did not wish to end her long-term relationship with Ida Thallon. A plan was formed by Blegen, Pierce, and Bert Hodge Hill (who seems to have had unreciprocated romantic feelings for Blegen) that Hodge Hill and Thallon would marry at the same time as Pierce and Blegen, and the four would live together; Thallon agreed on condition that she and Pierce would continue to travel and spend time together away from their husbands, and the two couples married and lodged together in Athens, Greece in 1924, in a relationship which they referred to as "the Family", "the quartet", and "the Pro Par" (short for "Professional Partnership").

Carl Blegen, a widower since his wife's death in 1966, died in Athens, Greece on August 24, 1971 at the age of 84. He is buried in the Protestant corner of the First Cemetery of Athens, together with Elizabeth Pierce Blegen. The graves of Ida Thallon and Bert Hodge Hill are also located in the corner. Carl W. Blegen bequeathed a large collection of his documents to the American School of Classical Studies at Athens.

Bibliography
1921. Korakou: A Prehistoric Settlement Near Corinth (The American School of Classical Studies at Athens)
1937. Prosymna: the Helladic Settlement Preceding the Argive Heraeum. (Cambridge University Press). 2 vols.
1941. Studies in the Arts and Architecture (University of Pennsylvania)
1950-1958. Troy: Excavations Conducted by the University of Cincinnati, 1932–38, 4 vols.
1963. Troy and the Trojans (Praeger)
1966-1973. The Palace of Nestor at Pylos in Western Messinia (with Marion Rawson. 3 vols.)

Sources
 Petrakis, Susan L. Ayioryitika: The 1928 Excavations of Carl Blegen at a Neolithic to Early Helladic Settlement in Arcadia (INSTAP Academic Press. 2002)
 Vogeikoff-Brogan, Natalia, Jack L. Davis, and Vassiliki Florou 2014. Carl W. Blegen: personal and archaeological narratives. Lockwood Press.

External links

New Title from ISD and Lockwood Press -- Carl W. Blegen: Personal and Archaeological Narratives   
 Blegen Library at the American School of Classical Studies at Athens
Carl Blegen Library at the University of Cincinnati
Finding Aid for Carl W. Blegen papers, Archives and Rare Books Library, University of Cincinnati, Cincinnati, Ohio

References

External links

1887 births
1971 deaths
University of Minnesota alumni
Yale University alumni
People from Minneapolis
University of Cincinnati faculty
American people of Norwegian descent
Pylos
Fellows of the British Academy
American expatriates in Greece
American expatriates in Turkey
Archaeologists of the Bronze Age Aegean
20th-century American archaeologists
Burials at the First Cemetery of Athens
Corresponding Fellows of the British Academy